Queensland University of Technology (QUT) is a public research university located in the urban coastal city of Brisbane, Queensland, Australia. QUT is located on two campuses in the Brisbane area viz. Gardens Point and Kelvin Grove. The university in its current form was founded in 1989, when the Queensland Institute of Technology (QIT) was made a university through the Queensland University of Technology Act 1988, with the resulting Queensland University of Technology beginning its operations from January 1989. In 1990, the Brisbane College of Advanced Education merged with QUT.

In 2020, QUT has 52,672 students enrolled (composed of 39,156 undergraduate students, 10,390 postgraduate students, and 661 non-award students), employs 5,049 full-time equivalent (FTE) staff members, a total revenue of $1.054 billion, and a total expenditure of $1.028 billion.

QUT was a member of the Australian Technology Network of universities, but withdrew participation on 28 September 2018.

History 
Queensland University of Technology (QUT) has a history that dates to 1849 when the Brisbane School of Arts was established. Queensland Institute of Technology (QIT) succeeded the Central Technical College and was formed in 1965. The current QUT was established as a university in 1989 from the merger of several predecessor institutions listed below:

Brisbane School of Arts (1849)
Brisbane Technical College (1882)
Central Technical College (1908)
Queensland Institute of Technology (1965)

Brisbane College of Advanced Education was formed in 1982, which itself is a combination of multiple predecessor institutions shown in the list below:
Brisbane Kindergarten Training College (1911)
Brisbane Kindergarten Teachers College (1965)
Queensland Teachers' Training College (1914)
Kelvin Grove Teachers College (1961)
Kelvin Grove College of Advanced Education (1976)
Kedron Park Teachers College (1961)
North Brisbane College of Advanced Education (1974)

In 1988, the Queensland University of Technology Act was passed for the grant of university status to Queensland Institute of Technology (QIT). As a result, QIT was granted university status and was operational as Queensland University of Technology (QUT) beginning in January 1989. The Brisbane College of Advanced Education joined with QUT in 1990.

The Gardens Point campus was once entirely housed in the 19th-century, former Government House of Queensland. In 1909, during the relocation of the governor's residence, the Old Government House and the surrounding five hectares were set aside for both a university and a technical college. The first university on the site was the University of Queensland which was moved to St Lucia in 1945, where it remains today.

Campuses and precincts 

QUT has three campuses. Each is a micro-community, with on-campus academic, recreational, and support facilities.

Gardens Point 
Gardens Point campus is located in Brisbane's city centre, beside the Brisbane River and adjacent to the City Botanic Gardens and Queensland Parliament House. At the centre of the campus is the Old Government House which was built in 1862 and re-opened in 2009. The faculties of Business, Law, and Science and Engineering are based at this campus.

Gardens Cultural Precinct 
Gardens Point campus hosts the Gardens Cultural Precinct, comprising the Gardens Theatre and QUT Art Museum, which offer a full theatre and exhibition program.
The QUT Art Museum houses the university's art collection, which focuses on contemporary Australian art, including painting, sculpture, decorative art and works on paper. The museum opened in 2000 and attracted about 350,000 people in its first decade of operations. The building is a 1930s neo-classical revivalist building designed by Peddle Thorpe Architects, Brisbane.
The Gardens Theatre features professional theatre, children's theatre, and student showcases. The Gardens Theatre is a medium-sized venue, formerly known as the Basil Jones Theatre, and was renovated with assistance from the Queensland Government. It was reopened as the Gardens Theatre in 1999 by then-Premier Peter Beattie. It provides space for QUT productions and visiting performers, and is the only theatre complex in Brisbane's central business district.

Science and Engineering Precinct 
The Science and Engineering Precinct was completed in November 2012. It brings together teaching and research in science, technology, engineering, and mathematics disciplines. The 200 million required for the precinct came from QUT (65 million), the Australian Government (75 million), the Queensland Government (35 million), and Atlantic Philanthropies (25 million).

Kelvin Grove 

The Kelvin Grove campus hosts the faculties of Creative Industries, Education, and Health as well as the QUT International College and the Institute of Health and Biomedical Innovation.

QUT Kelvin Grove Health Clinics offer services for free or low-cost services to staff, students, and the general public.

The Creative Industries Precinct architecturally designed in joint venture by KIRK (Richard Kirk Architect) + Hassell, located at Kelvin Grove campus, includes many arts and exhibition spaces open to the public:
the Roundhouse Theatre, a large theatre venue and home of the La Boite Theatre Company.
interactive exhibition spaces.
an experimental black-box theatre.
multimedia performance spaces.
public artwork exhibition spaces.

The Precinct was built at a cost of around $60 million on the site of the Gona Barracks, an Australian Army barracks, which was decommissioned in 1998.

Canberra Executive Education Centre 
QUT hosts a small campus in the suburb of Deakin in Canberra, called the Canberra Executive Education Centre (CEEC). The CEEC provides in-person classes for QUT's Executive Master of Business Administration, which is jointly taught with an academic mission from the MIT Sloan School of Management. The Centre also provides professional training and development short courses through the QUTeX brand and is an in-person hub for the QUT Public Sector Management Program (QUT PSMP).

Former campuses

Caboolture 
The campus offered undergraduate degrees in business, education, and nursing, and first-year studies in creative industries before the campus was transferred to the University of the Sunshine Coast on 8 January 2018.

Carseldine 
In November 2008, Carseldine teaching, research, and support activities were relocated to Kelvin Grove and Gardens Point campuses. This included the School of Psychology and Counselling and the School of public health and social work, as well as some business, science, and information technology subjects. The campus has since been closed and was subsequently renovated by the Queensland Government. Following QUT's decision to vacate the campus and the lack of a suitable education provider to take over the site, the State Government announced plans to decentralise government services and move around 1000 employees to the remodeled former QUT buildings, which occurred post-2012.

Academic profile

QUT offers undergraduate and postgraduate coursework, graduate diplomas and certificates, and higher degree research courses (Masters and PhDs) including, but not limited to the fields listed below:
Architecture
Business
Communication
Creative Industries
Design
Education
Health and Community
Information Technology
Law and Justice
Mathematics
Science and Engineering

The QUT Business School has triple accreditation (AMBA, EQUIS, and AACSB). It is placed within the top 1% of Business Schools worldwide.

San Jose State University in San Jose, CA, US offers a PhD program in library science in collaboration with Queensland University of Technology.

Rankings

QUT ranks within the top 10 Australian universities by the Excellence in Research for Australia and the Times Higher Education World University Rankings. The university is consistently ranked in the top 12 universities of Australia and within the top 1% universities worldwide by the Times Higher Education World University Rankings, QS World University Rankings, Academic Ranking of World Universities and amongst other world university rankings.

QUT was ranked as Australia's best university under 50 years of age in 2013 by the Times Higher Education World University Rankings in their Top 100 Under 50 years World Young University Rankings category, which was placed at No.1 position in Australia and ranked 26th internationally in that category. In 2016, it was ranked 28th globally in the THE Top 150 Under 50 years World Young University Rankings category and in 2017, it was ranked 24th worldwide in the THE Top 200 Under 50 years World Young University Rankings category by the Times Higher Education World University Rankings and both times secured the second-highest and top 2 position in Australia. QUT is ranked 20th worldwide in the year 2018 by the THE Top 250 Under 50 years World Young University Rankings. QUT is ranked 19th globally for both the years 2019 and 2020 by the QS Top 50 Under 50 years World Young University Rankings.

Research 

QUT establishes collaborative research partnerships between academia, industry, government and community actors. The university is a key member of the Brisbane Diamantina Health Partners, Queensland's first academic health science system. QUT attracts national grants and industry funding and has a number of research centres, including:

Indigenous Research Centres 
 Carumba Institute
 National Indigenous Research and Knowledges Network

Research infrastructure

Former research institutes 
 Institute of Health and Biomedical Innovation
 Institute for Future Environments

Queensland Business Leaders Hall of Fame 

In 2009, State Library of Queensland, the Queensland Library Foundation, and QUT Business School collaborated to establish the Queensland Business Leaders Hall of Fame (QBLHOF) initiative. The QBLHOF recognises outstanding contributions made by organisations, companies and individuals to develop the Queensland economy and society, both contemporary and historical. A governing committee determines a list of inductees based on a set of criteria including:
 Sustained leadership
 Major financial contribution
 Pioneering
 Outstanding contribution
 Achievement of iconic status

The inductees are announced at a gala event each year in July. Since 2014, the QBLHOF has also awarded an annual Fellowship, to recipients working on a research project that utilises the resources of the John Oxley Library to produce new interpretations of Queensland's business history.

Library
The QUT Library provides learning and research support to students and staff. There are three library branches at QUT: Gardens Point library, Law library, and Kelvin Grove library. In addition to borrowing and information access services, the QUT library also offers specialised support for coursework students, academic staff and researchers.

The QUT library has a resource budget of approximately $13 million to buy subscription to academic journals and other materials. QUT Library provides the 3rd largest collection of ebooks and online video of any Australian or New Zealand university library.

The QUT library hosts a number of institutional repositories. In 2003, it became the first university in the world to adopt an institution-wide Open Access policy, mandating the deposit of research papers in its institutional repository, QUT ePrints. QUT Digital Collections, managed by QUT Library, brings together digitised and born digital collections for dissemination to and reuse by the global community. When possible, items will be made open access and available via a Creative Commons license. Please see individual resources for specific copyright, license and access information. QUT Digital Collections is built on EPrints repository software.

Criticism 
QUT has come under renewed criticism around its workplace culture, allegations of bullying and misrepresentation of job losses in 2020-21. Many academic and professional staff have expressed living in fear of this workplace, in the most significant publicity the university has received in several years. Initial steps towards change in response to these claims have been made, although this has been met with skepticism by staff, citing issues with the concept of "leadership training" for executive managers, and the lack of urgency in implementing a safe method of complaint.

The current vice-chancellor Margaret Sheil has been criticised for excessively lavish renovations for a private bathroom with "marble finishes" in her personal office.

Notable alumni and faculty

See also

 List of universities in Australia
 MacLennan-Hookham suspension

References

External links 

 
 

 
Universities in Brisbane
Technical universities and colleges in Australia
Australian Technology Network
1989 establishments in Australia
George Street, Brisbane
Educational institutions established in 1989